The Central District of Eslamshahr County is in Tehran province, Iran. At the National Census in 2006, its population was 394,151 in 100,438 households. The following census in 2011 counted 427,883 people in 122,848 households. At the latest census in 2016, the district had 465,353 inhabitants in 142,787 households.

References 

Eslamshahr County

Districts of Tehran Province

Populated places in Tehran Province

Populated places in Eslamshahr County